The Korean Open is a darts tournament that has been held since 2007.

List of winners

Men's

Women's

2007 establishments in South Korea
Darts tournaments
Sports competitions in South Korea